Ismail Jakobs (born 17 August 1999) is a professional footballer who plays as a left back or left winger for Ligue 1 club Monaco. Born in Germany, he represents the Senegal national team.

Club career

1.FC Köln
After starting his career at BC Bliesheim, Jakobs joined the youth academy of 1.FC Köln in 2012. In 2017, having progressed through all of the club's youth sides, he was introduced into Köln's U21 team competing in the fourth-tier Regionalliga West.

Ahead of the 2019–20 season Jakobs was promoted to the club's first team by then manager Achim Beierlorzer. On 8 November 2019, he made his debut appearance in a match against TSG Hoffenheim. On 18 December 2019, Jakobs scored his first goal as a professional in a 2–4 victory against Eintracht Frankfurt. In March 2020, the club announced that Jakobs' contract had been extended until 2022. In October of the same year, he signed a further extension keeping him at Köln until July 2024.

AS Monaco
On 12 July 2021, Jakobs was transferred to Ligue 1 side AS Monaco, where he signed a contract until 2026. He made his debut for the club in a 2–0 win over Sparta Prague in the third qualifying round of the UEFA Champions League on 3 August.

International career
On 21 August 2020, Jakobs was nominated for Germany's under-21 national team by manager Stefan Kuntz.

Personal life
Born in Germany, Jakobs is of Senegalese descent through his father.

Career statistics

Club

References

External links
 Profile at the AS Monaco FC website

1999 births
Living people
Footballers from Cologne
People from Erftstadt
Sportspeople from Cologne (region)
Association football fullbacks
Senegalese footballers
Senegal international footballers
German footballers
Germany under-21 international footballers
Olympic footballers of Germany
German people of Senegalese descent
German sportspeople of African descent
Citizens of Senegal through descent
Senegalese people of German descent
1. FC Köln II players
1. FC Köln players
AS Monaco FC players
Bundesliga players
Regionalliga players
Ligue 1 players
2022 FIFA World Cup players
German expatriate footballers
German expatriate sportspeople in Monaco
Expatriate footballers in Monaco
Senegalese expatriate footballers
Senegalese expatriate sportspeople in Monaco
Footballers at the 2020 Summer Olympics